The absorption rate constant Ka is a value used in pharmacokinetics to describe the rate at which a drug enters into the system. It is expressed in units of time−1. The Ka is related to the absorption half-life (t1/2a) per the following equation: Ka = ln(2) / t1/2a.

Ka values can typically only be found in research articles. This is in contrast to parameters like bioavailability and elimination half-life, which can often be found in drug and pharmacology handbooks.

References

Pharmacokinetic metrics